Gokul Prasad Baskota is a Nepali politician. He served as Minister of Communication and Information Technology of Nepal. and is currently serving as the Member of House Of Representatives (Nepal) elected from Kavrepalanchok-2, Province No. 3 for the second term.

Controversies 
Baskota is frequently known for his uncharacteristically brash attitude, using derogatory language towards political opponents, and remarks attacking the free press.

An audio clip of Baskota bargaining for 700 million in bribes with an agent of a Swiss company based in Kathmandu over the procurement of security printing for the government was leaked to media outlets.
Baskota was accused of demanding a Rs 700 million bribe in exchange for a contract to print e-passports in Nepal. He subsequently resigned his ministerial position. He shortly filed a defamation lawsuit against Mr. Vijay Mishra.

References

Living people
Nepal Communist Party (NCP) politicians
Nepal MPs 2017–2022
Communist Party of Nepal (Unified Marxist–Leninist) politicians
1970 births
Nepal MPs 2022–present